The Black Battalion (1916-1920) Canada's best kept military secret refers to the 1987 book by Calvin W. Ruck CM about the No. 2 Construction Battalion, Canadian Expeditionary Force, the only all-black battalion to serve in World War I. The book's main theme is to chronicle the contributions of Black veterans of the Great War (1914-1918), whose military heritage had been forgotten. Ruck served on the Canadian Senate from 1998 to 2000, and has been honoured with the Order of Canada and the Governor General's award.

Context
Following the reunion of the Black Battalion on November 12–14, 1982 organized by The Society for the Protection and Preservation of Black Culture in Nova Scotia as its first public event, which brought together nine surviving black WWI veterans, Ruck was inspired to delve into their history. Their contributions to the war effort were largely unknown until the publication of this book.

Content

Ruck provided the context behind the establishment of the segregated No. 2 Construction Battalion.

Five hundred black soldiers volunteered from Nova Scotia alone, representing 56% of the Black Battalion. It was the only black battalion in Canadian military history and also the only Canadian Battalion composed of black soldiers to serve in World War I. The first black officer in the British Empire, Reverend William A. White led the Battalion.

Other publications
Ruck also published Canada's Black Battalion: No. 2 Construction, 1916-1920

Calvin W. Ruck

In 1998 Ruck was named to the Canadian Senate and was conferred with an honorary Doctorate of Civil Law by University of King's College.

See also

 Black Canadian
Military history of Nova Scotia
 Victoria Rifles (Nova Scotia)
 Captain Runchey's Company of Coloured Men
Black Nova Scotians

References

Military history of Canada
History of Black people in Canada
Black Nova Scotians